Lenka Šmídová (born March 26, 1975 in Havlíčkův Brod) is a Czech sailor. She won the Silver medal in the 2004 Summer Olympics in Athens  in the Europe class.

References

1975 births
Olympic sailors of the Czech Republic
Czech female sailors (sport)
Sailors at the 2000 Summer Olympics – Europe
Sailors at the 2004 Summer Olympics – Europe
Sailors at the 2008 Summer Olympics – 470
Olympic silver medalists for the Czech Republic
Olympic medalists in sailing
Living people
Medalists at the 2004 Summer Olympics
Sportspeople from Havlíčkův Brod